The climate of New York City features a humid subtropical variety (Cfa), with parts of the city transitioning into a humid continental climate. (Dfa) This gives the city cool, wet winters and hot, humid summers with plentiful rainfall all year round. Meteorological records have been kept at Central Park since 1821, although the station was relocated to a different part of the park on January 1, 1920. There are also other weather stations in the area including one at LaGuardia Airport, beginning in 1940, and at JFK Airport, beginning in 1948. However, due to Central Park's long records and central location, it is often considered the main station for the city. Hence, all records unless otherwise stated will be for this station.

However, LaGuardia reported  on July 3, 1966.

The city can be prone to extremes. Snowfall is an infrequent occurrence in the city, on average occurring on only 12 days per year, though it can be heavy when it occurs. The city can also be prone to strong winds, being a coastal location it is exposed to the Atlantic. This can be especially pronounced during the autumn and winter months, with a gust of  being reported on December 2, 1974. Governors Island, Manhattan, in New York Harbor, is planned to host a US$1 billion research and education center poised to make New York City the global leader in addressing the climate crisis.

Classifications 

New York City falls under different climate types depending on the climate classification system used. However, the Köppen climate classification system is the most widely used climate classification scheme.

In the Holdridge life zones system, having a mean annual biotemperature above  and mean annual precipitation above , New York City features a warm temperate moist forest climate.
The USDA plant hardiness zones are 7a and 7b. Most of the city is found in 7b, with forested areas and parks being in 7a, as shown in Staten Island and suburban areas. The city also has some small densely populated areas in 8a, like around Laguardia airport.

Temperature
The city's regime of temperature features large seasonal swings, with 4 distinct seasons. However, due to its proximity to the Atlantic Ocean, these swings are less significant than areas further inland. The Atlantic serves as a moderator of the temperature meaning the city is milder than areas inland during the winter and cooler during the summer. Although, being on the east coast, this effect is less pronounced. All extremes are for the Central Park station.

Averages
Temperatures above  and below  are very rare, with the last occurrences being July 18, 2012 and February 14, 2016, respectively.

Highest daily temperatures

Lowest daily temperatures

Daily record warm minima

Daily record cold maxima

Highest averages

Lowest averages

Precipitation

New York City sees frequent, heavy rainfall which averages  annually. Spring is the wettest season. February is the driest month. Every single month in the city's recorded history has reported some rainfall, showing the variability of the climate. The record for days without rain, is 36 consecutive days, between October 10 and November 13, 1924.

The city sees snow, primarily in winter. It sometimes snows in late autumn and early spring.

Averages

Rainfall Extremes

Lowest

Highest

Snowfall

Highest

Lowest

Other phenomena

Sunshine, UV and daylight
The city generally experiences sunny conditions. As a result of New York City's latitude, it is not subject to the extremes of daylight that places much farther north see. However, it is far north enough for there to be a moderate change of possible daylight hours throughout the year.

Wind
The wind is seldom strong in New York City but can occasionally be noticeable. This is especially true in the autumn and winter seasons when extratropical depressions often bring strong winds.
However, tropical storms can sometimes affect the area, although they are infrequent and usually weak. Most recently Hurricane Sandy struck the city on October 29, 2012, causing billions of dollars in damage. It resulted in loss of power, severe flooding and many residents being displaced.

Climate change

Being a coastal city, New York City is expected to experience significant effects from rising sea levels. The city is also expected to become more susceptible to storm surges and flooding, meaning events like Hurricane Sandy's impacts will become more likely in the future.

Temperature
The temperature in New York City has generally increased steadily of the last 150 years and this trend is expected to continue due to anthropogenic warming. By 2080, it is predicted that the climate of the city will be similar to northern Arkansas. The mean temperature has risen by  since the 1970s and this warming is expected to accelerate in the coming decades.

Precipitation
Precipitation in the city has significantly increased since 2000; both rainfall and snowfall have risen, but snowfall has increased much more significantly. However, it is argued that such trends, being so recent, make it impossible to predict whether such increases will continue or become steadier.

Station data

Time series plot for Central Park, 1869–present

Notes

References

New York City
Environment of New York City